Melissa Marie Ortiz Matallana (born 24 January 1990) is an American-born Colombian Olympic and professional footballer who plays for the Colombia national team as a striker or attacking midfielder.

Early life
Ortiz was born in West Palm Beach, Florida. She graduated from Cardinal Newman High School in 2008.

College career
Ortiz played for Lynn University for four years where she was nominated for the 2011 Sunshine State Conference Co-Player and Offensive Player of the Year.  She became the first player in the program's history to receive both awards in the same season.  Additionally, she was the very first Offensive Player of the Year and second Player of the Year.  At Lynn, Ortiz  accumulated over 100 points, becoming the 10th player in school history to accomplish this feat. Her SSC Player and Offensive Player of the Year recognition gave her the perfect trifecta award, as in 2008 she was the SSC Freshman of the Year.  Ortiz was also the second player at Lynn to be a four-time All-SSC selection.

Club career

KR Reykjavik
She played the 2013 season in group A of Iceland's second division 1. delid kvenna with KR Reykjavik in their first season out of the first division Úrvalsdeild kvenna since 1984.  Oritz's four goals in eleven appearances helped the team to with the second division regular season, but Reykjavik lost the promotion play-off.

Boston Breakers
On 5 December 2013 Ortiz signed for the Boston Breakers of the National Women's Soccer League, but on 3 April 2014, the Breakers waived Ortiz.

Cúcuta Deportivo
In 2017, Ortiz played for Cúcuta Deportivo Club in the first women's Colombian Professional League DIMAYOR. Cúcuta made it to the quarter finals of the league playoffs.

International career
Ortiz made 5 appearances for the Colombia U-20 team, representing the country in the 2010 FIFA U-20 Women's World Cup where she scored the team's best goal in a 3–1 loss to Germany.

In 2009, Ortiz made her debut for the Colombia senior team. She was named alternate in the 2011 FIFA Women's World Cup in Germany, then to the full team in the 2012 London Olympics. On 28 July 2012 at Hampden Park, Ortiz came on as a substitute in the 3–0 loss to the United States team that included Alex Morgan, Abby Wambach and future teammate Heather O'Reilly of the Boston Breakers. On 31 July 2012 she played in front of a crowd of 13,184 at St James' Park which is home to Newcastle United against France where they lost 1–0 in the final Group G game.

After the Colombian Federation's several year pause from competition, Ortiz returned to represent the country in the 2014 CONMEBOL Copa America where she scored 1 goal against Venezuela and helped qualify Colombia to the 2015 FIFA Women's World Cup, 2015 Pan-American Games, and 2016 Rio Olympics. She also competed and was named with her teammates silver medalists of the Central American Games Veracruz in the 2014. Colombia lost in the final to Mexico 2–0.

Ortiz was active with the national team all through 2015 in preparation for the FIFA Women's World Cup. Just a week before the tournament, she tore her right Achilles tendon during a scrimmage in Colorado. This left her out of competition from the World Cup and Pan-American Games.

In 2016, Ortiz returned to action from injury and was named to the Olympic roster as an alternate. Ortiz has 28 international team appearances and 3 goals.

References

External links
 
 Sunshine State Conference player profile

1990 births
Living people
People with acquired Colombian citizenship
Colombian women's footballers
Women's association football forwards
Women's association football midfielders
Colombia women's international footballers
Olympic footballers of Colombia
Footballers at the 2012 Summer Olympics
Colombian expatriate women's footballers
Colombian expatriate sportspeople in Iceland
Expatriate women's footballers in Iceland
American women's soccer players
Soccer players from Florida
People from West Palm Beach, Florida
American sportspeople of Colombian descent
Lynn Fighting Knights women's soccer players
American expatriate women's soccer players
American expatriate sportspeople in Iceland